Tongeia ion is a butterfly of the family Lycaenidae. It was described by John Henry Leech in 1891. Tongeia ion closely resembles Tongeia fischeri.

Subspecies
T. i. ion western China, Yunnan-Sichuan-Tibet border and also recorded from Thailand
T. i. cratylus (Fruhstorfer, 1915) Sichuan-Tibet border (Batang, Mangkang)
T. i. cellariusi (Bollow, 1930) eastern Gansu (Qinling Mts.)

References

Leech, J. H. "New Species of Rhopalocera from western China". The Entomologist. (original description)

Butterflies described in 1891
Butterflies of Asia
Polyommatini
Taxa named by John Henry Leech